The tree of life is a motif in various mythologies and a metaphor for the common descent of life on Earth.

Tree of life may also refer to:

Arts and entertainment

Film
 Charles Darwin and the Tree of Life, a 2009 BBC documentary
 T.o.L. ("Trees of Life"),  the collective name for the creators of the film Tamala 2010: A Punk Cat in Space
 The Tree of Life (film), a 2011 film directed by Terrence Malick
 The Tree of Life, English version of Geedka nolosha (1988), a short film from Somali writer and director Abdulkadir Ahmed Said

Literature
 Tree-of-Life, a plot device in the Known Space science fiction stories
 Tree of Life (novel), 1992 novel by the Guadeloupean writer, Maryse Condé
 The Tree of Life, novel by Chava Rosenfarb 1972
 The Tree of Life, novel by Hugh Nissenson 1985
 The Tree of Life (Bernice Summerfield), a 2005 Dr Who novel by Mark Michalowski
 The Tree of Life, an exposition of magick written by Israel Regardie in 1932

Music
 Tree of Life (album), a 2013 album by Audiomachine
 The Tree of Life (Cecil Taylor album), 1998
 The Tree of Life (soundtrack), the soundtrack to the 2011 film
 Tree of Life, an album by Lila Downs
 The Tree of Life my soul hath seen, the original title of the poem and carol Jesus Christ the Apple Tree

Sculpture
  ("Tree of Life" in Italian), a 35 meter sculpture built for Expo 2015, Milan, Italy
 Tree of Life (Mexican pottery), a clay sculpture style associated with Metepec, Mexico State
 Tree of Life (Kester), a 2005 Mozambican sculpture now in the British Museum, London, U.K.
 Tree of Life (sculpture), a 1964 sculpture by installed on the campus of University of Portland, Oregon, U.S.
 The Tree of Life (sculpture), a 2012 bronze sculpture and the Nuremberg Zoo, Germany
 Tree of Life (Disney), sculptural icon of Disney's Animal Kingdom theme park
 Tree of Life (White), a 2002 sculpture at Mitchell Boulevard Park in Milwaukee, Wisconsin, U.S.
 Metaphor: The Tree of Utah or Tree of Life, a 1986 sculpture in the Utah desert, U.S.
 Trees of Life, a public art installation in Managua, Nicaragua

Other uses in arts and entertainment
 The Tree of Life (module), an accessory for the Dungeons & Dragons role-playing game
 Tree of Life mural (Manav Gupta)
 The Tree of Life (TV series), a Bulgarian historical drama
 The Tree of Life, Stoclet Frieze, a 1909 painting by an Austrian symbolist painter Gustav Klimt
 A major plot point in the 2008 game Prince of Persia (2008 video game)

Biology
 Árbol del Tule, a large tree in Mexico also known as the "Tree of Life"
 Tree of Life (Bahrain), a solitary tree in the desert of Bahrain
 Tree of life (biology), a metaphor describing the interrelatedness of living things through evolution
 Tree of Life Web Project, a collaborative project providing information about the diversity and phylogeny of life on Earth 
 Arborvitae (Latin for tree of life), a genus of coniferous trees
 Arbor vitae (anatomy) (Latin for tree of life), the cerebellar white matter, named for its branched, tree-like appearance
 Adansonia, known as "Baobab" and "Upside-down tree" often called a "Tree of Life" due to its longevity (over 2000 years)

Religion and spirituality
 Etz Chaim, a religious Hebrew term for "Tree of Life"
 Mesoamerican world tree, a motif in pre-Columbian Mesoamerican mythologies and iconographies
 Izapa Stela 5, also known as the "Tree of Life" stone
 Tree of Life – Or L'Simcha Congregation, a Conservative Jewish synagogue in Pittsburgh, Pennsylvania
Tree of Life Synagogue shooting in Pittsburgh (2018)
 Tree of life (biblical), a tree at the center of the Garden of Eden
 Tree of life (Kabbalah), a mystical concept within the Kabbalah of Judaism
 Tree of life (Quran) or tree of immortality
 Tree of Life Christian Schools, a private school system in and near Columbus, Ohio
 Tree of Life Version, a Messianic Bible translation
 Tree of life vision, a more detailed description of Nephi's vision of the Tree of Life contained in the Book of Mormon
 The Tree of Life Rejuvenation Center, run by Gabriel Cousens
 Yggdrasil, the world tree  in Norse mythology

Other uses
 Tree of life (phylogenetics), a phylogenetic tree showing the evolutionary relationships among various biological species
 Arbor vitae (disambiguation)